Professor Chris Baldick (born 1954) is a British academic who teaches at Goldsmiths College, University of London. He has worked in the fields of literary criticism, literary theory, literary history and literary terminology. He was previously Senior Lecturer in English at Edge Hill College of Higher Education in Ormskirk.

He is the son of Robert Baldick, a scholar of French literature and translator.

Selected publications
 The Decadence Reader, ed. with Jane Desmarais (Manchester: Manchester University Press, 2010)
 The Oxford Dictionary of Literary Terms 
 The Concise Oxford Dictionary of Literary Terms 
 The Oxford English Literary History, volume 10 (1910–1940): The Modern Movement 
 Criticism and Literary Theory 1890 to the Present 
 The Oxford Book of Gothic Tales (ed) 
 In Frankenstein’s Shadow: Myth, Monstrosity, and Nineteenth-Century Writing 
 The Social Mission of English Criticism 1848-1932

References

1954 births
Living people
Academics of Goldsmiths, University of London
Academics of Edge Hill University